Badafshan-e Pain (also Romanized as Bādafshān-e Pā’īn; also known as Gāshū Pā’īn) is a village in Rahdar Rural District, in the Central District of Rudan County, Hormozgan Province, Iran. At the 2006 census, its population was 30, in 8 families.

References 

Populated places in Rudan County